John Lawrence (born 23 November 1957) is a South African cricketer. He played in one List A and eight first-class matches for Border in 1981/82 and 1982/83.

See also
 List of Border representative cricketers

References

External links
 

1957 births
Living people
South African cricketers
Border cricketers
Cricketers from East London, Eastern Cape